Leif Gunnar "Blixten" Henriksson (26 December 1943 – 15 March 2019) was a Swedish professional ice hockey player and coach. He spent most of his playing career with Frölunda HC. His nickname "Blixten" ("Lightning") referred to his skating strength. He finished fourth in the team tournament at the 1968 Winter Olympics.

Henriksson died in March 2019.

References

External links

1943 births
2019 deaths
Frölunda HC players
People from Karlskoga Municipality
Swedish ice hockey coaches
Swedish ice hockey right wingers
Olympic ice hockey players of Sweden
Ice hockey players at the 1968 Winter Olympics
Sportspeople from Örebro County